Roland Pierre Marais (c. 1685, Paris – c. 1750, Paris) was a French viol player and composer. He was the son of the composer Marin Marais (1656–1728).

His compositions are written in a similar style to his father's.

Works
1711: Nouvelle méthode de musique pour servir d'introduction aux amateurs modernes ( lost))Règles d'accompagnement pour la basse de viole (The Hague)
1735: Premier Livre de Pièces de Viole
1738: Deuxième Livre

External links

Previews of Marais' Suite in c minor

Musicians from Paris
French male classical composers
French Baroque composers
French Baroque viol players
1680s births
1750s deaths
18th-century classical composers
18th-century French composers
18th-century French male musicians
17th-century male musicians